Miloslav Mečíř Jr. and Marek Semjan were the defending champions, but they lost to Simon Greul and Bastian Knittel 3–6, 4–6.
Simon Greul and Bastian Knittel won the title, defeating Facundo Bagnis and Eduardo Schwank 2–6, 6–3, [11–9] in the final.

Seeds

Draw

Draw

References
 Doubles Draw

Kosice Open - Doubles
2011 Doubles